This is a list of British scientists.

A
 Alcuin (735-804), scholar and theologian
 Adelard (1080-1150), mathematician, astronomer, alchemist, physicist philosopher
 Frederick Abel (1827–1902), chemist
 Arthur Adams (1820–1878), physician and naturalist
 William Grylls Adams (1836-1915), physicist and astronomer
 Edgar Douglas Adrian (1889–1977), electrophysiologist
 Arthur Aikin (1773–1855), chemist
 John Arderne (1307-1392), was an English physician and surgeon who invented his own anesthetic that combined hemlock, henbane, and opium. In his writings, he also described how to properly excise and remove the abscess caused by anal fistula.
 William Aiton (1731–1793), botanist
 John Albery (1936–2013), physical chemist
 
 
 
 
 
 Francis William Aston (1877–1945), physicist
 David Attenborough (born 1926), naturalist
 Charlotte Auerbach (1899–1994), geneticist
 David Axon (1951–2012), astrophysicist

B
 Bede (672-735), He wrote a study on the Nature of Objects, several books on the mathematical/astronomical subject of computation, the most influential of which was titled On Computation. Time _ He made original discoveries about the nature of tides, and his work on calculations became necessary elements of the education of the clergy, and thus greatly influenced the knowledge of the natural world of the early Middle Ages.
 Francis Bacon (1561–1626), philosopher, "father of the scientific method"
 Roger Bacon (1219–1292 approximately), philosopher, advocate of the scientific method
 Isaac Barrow (1640-1676), mathematician
 James Bradley (1692-1762), astronomer
 John Hutton Balfour (1808–1884), botanist
 Neil Bartlett (1932–2008), chemist
 Derek Barton (1918–1998), chemist
 Henry Walter Bates (1825–1892), naturalist
 Patrick Bateson (1938–2017), zoologist
 Michael Bearpark (born 20th century), chemist
 John Beddington (born 1945)
 Thomas Bell (1792–1880), zoologist
 David Bellamy (1933–2019),
 Ralph Benjamin (1922–2019), inventor
 Edward Turner Bennett (1797–1836)
 George Bentham (1800–1884), botanist
 Robert Bentley (1821–1893), botanist
 Tim Berners-Lee (born 1955), computer scientist
 Kevin Beurle (1956–2009)
 Thomas Bewick (1753–1828)
 Sheila Bingham (1947–2009)
 Ann Bishop (1899–1990)
 Joseph Black (1728–1799), chemist
 John Blackwall (1790–1881)
 Thomas Blakiston (1832–1891), naturalist
 William Thomas Blanford (1832–1905), geologist
 David Mervyn Blow (1931–2004), physician
 Edward Blyth (1810–1873), ornithologist
 Edward August Bond (1815–1898)
 Edmund John Bowen (1898–1980), physical chemist
 Humphry John Moule Bowen (1929–2001), chemist
 Edward Augustus Bowles (1865–1954), botanist
 Robert Boyle (1627–1691), "father of chemistry"
 Charles Vernon Boys (1855–1944), physicist
 Dennis Bray (born 20th century), biologist
 Malcolm Brenner (born 1951)
 Sydney Brenner (1927–2019), molecular biologist
 Alan Brisdon (born 20th century), fluorine chemist
 Donald Broadbent (1926–1993)
 Robert Brown (1773–1858), botanist
 David Bruce (1855–1931)
 Francis Buchanan-Hamilton (1762–1829)
 John Burdon-Sanderson (1828–1905), physiologist
 Jocelyn Bell Burnell (born 1943), astrophysicist
 Alan Butement (1904–1990), physicist

C
 Roger Coset (1682-1716), mathematician
 William Crabtree (1610-1644), mathematician and astronomer
 Robert W. Cahn (1924–2007), metallurgist
 Sandy Cairncross (born 1948), epidemiologist
 George Caley (1770–1829), explorer and botanist
 Philip Pearsall Carpenter (1819–1877), conchologist
 Mark Catesby (1683–1749), naturalist
 Richard Caton (1842–1926), physiologist
 Henry Cavendish (1731–1810), physicist and chemist
 Colin Cherry (1914–1979), cognitive scientist
 Harriette Chick (1875–1977), microbiologist and protein scientist
 Samuel Hunter Christie (1784–1865), physicist and mathematician
 G. Marius Clore FRS (born 1955), molecular biophysicist
 Marcela Contreras (born 1942), blood expert and immunologist
 Verona Conway (1910–1986), plant zecologist
 Charles Coulson (1910–1974), theoretical chemist
 Archibald Scott Couper (1831–1892), chemist
 Brian Cox (born 1968), physicist
 Eva Crane (1912–2007), entomologist
 Francis Crick (1916–2004), molecular biologist
 Andrew Crosse (1784–1855), pioneer in the study of electricity
 Alexander Crum Brown (1838–1922), organic chemist
 Nicholas Culpeper (1616–1654), botanist
 Allan Cunningham (1791–1839), botanist
 William Curtis (1746–1799), botanist

D
 John Dalton (1766–1844), chemist: "father of modern atomic theory"
 Charles Darwin (1809–1882), originator of the theory of natural selection
 Erasmus Darwin (1731–1802), naturalist
 George Darwin (1845-1912), astronomer, the first person to develop an evolutionary theory for the Sun-Earth-Moon system based on mathematical analysis
 Donald Davies (1924–2000), computer scientist
 Humphry Davy (1778–1829), chemist and inventor
 Richard Dawkins (born 1941), ethologist and evolutionary biologist
 James Dewar (1842–1923), chemist and physicist
 Lewis Weston Dillwyn (1778–1855), botanist and conchologist
 Paul Dirac (1902–1984), theoretical physicist
 Deborah Doniach (1912–2004), clinical immunologist
 James Donn (1758–1813), botanist
 Henry Doubleday (1808–1875), entomologist
 David Douglas (1799–1834), botanist

E
 George Edwards (1693–1773), ornithologist
 Harry Julius Emeléus (1903–1993), inorganic chemist
 Thomas Campbell Eyton (1809–1880), zoologist

F
 John Flamsteed (1646-1719), astronomer
 Hugh Falconer (1808–1865), palaeontologist
 Michael Faraday (1791–1867), pioneer of electricity
 Benjamin Franklin (1706-1790), philosopher, physicist, political scientist
 John Farrah (1849–1907), English botanist and meteorologist
 Barry Fell (1917–1994), zoologist
 James Fisher (1922–1970), ornithologist
 Ronald Fisher (1890–1962), geneticist and statistician
 Jim Flegg (born 20th century), ornithologist
 Alexander Fleming (1881–1955), physician and microbiologist
 Thomas Bainbrigge Fletcher (1878–1950), entomologist
 E. B. Ford (1901–1988), ecological geneticist
 Jeff Forshaw (born 1968), particle physicist
 Robert Fortune (1813–1880), botanist
 Carey Foster (1835–1919), chemist and physicist
 Henry Foster (1797–1831), naval surveyor
 Ruth Fowler Edwards (1930–2013), geneticist
 Edward Frankland (1825–1899), chemist
 Rosalind Franklin (1920–1958), X-ray crystallographer
 Elizabeth Fulhame (18th–19th centuries), chemist, pioneer in study of catalysis
 Vera Furness (1921–2002) industrial chemist

G
 Robert Grosseteste (1168-1253), mathematician, astronomer, philosopher, theologian,
 Stephan Gray (1666-1736), physicist, first made the distinction between conduction and insulation, and discovered the action-at-a-distance phenomenon of electrostatic induction.
 William Gascoigne (1610-1644), mathematician and astronomer
 William Gilbert (1544-1603), philosopher and physician
 Patrick Geddes (1854–1932), biologist and geographer
 John Gerard (1545–1611/12), botanist
 Michael Gerzon (1945–1996), acoustic physicist
 Charles Henry Gimingham (1923–2018), botanist
 Frederick DuCane Godman (1834–1919), naturalist and ornithologist
 Jane Goodall (born 1934), primatologist, ethologist and anthropologist
 June Goodfield (born 1927), historian of science
 Dougal Goodman (born 20th century), low-temperature physicist
 Guy Goodwin (born 1947), neuroscientist
 George Gordon (1806–1879), botanist
 Raymond Gosling (1926–2015), physicist
 Philip Henry Gosse (1810–1888), naturalist
 John Gould (1804–1881), ornithologist
 Monica Grady (born 1958), space scientist
 Thomas Graham (1805–1869) chemist
 George Robert Gray (1808–1872), zoologist
 John Edward Gray (1800–1875), zoologist
 Malcolm Green (1936–2020), inorganic chemist
 Edward Grey (1862–1933), ornithologist
 Frederick Griffith (1879–1941), bacteriologist
 Albert Günther (1830–1914), zoologist
 Frederick Guthrie (1833–1886), physicist and chemist
 Helen Gwynne-Vaughan (1879–1967), botanist and mycologist

H
 Robert Hues (1553-1632), geographer
 Jeremiah Horrocks (1618-1641), astronomer
 William Herschel (1738-1822), astronomer
 J. B. S. Haldane (John Burdon Sanderson Haldane, 1892–1964), evolutionary biologist
 John Scott Haldane (1860–1936), physiologist
 Wendy Hall (born 1952), computer scientist
 Edmond Halley (1656–1742), astronomer
 Frances Mary Hamer (1894–1980), chemist
 William Donald Hamilton (1936–2000), evolutionary biologist
 Sylvanus Charles Thorp Hanley (1819–1899), conchologist and malacologist
 William Vernon Harcourt (1789–1871), clergyman and student of glass
 Arthur Harden (1865–1940), biochemist
 Anita Harding (1952–1995), neurologist
 Thomas Hardwicke (1755–1835), naturalist
 Alister Clavering Hardy (1896–1985), marine biologist
 Richard Harrison (born 20th century), physicist
 William Henry Harvey (1811–1866), phycologist
 Charles Hatchett (1765–1847), mineralogist and analytical chemist
 Walter Norman Haworth (1883–1950), chemist
 Stephen Hawking (1942–2018), cosmologist
 Arthur Hay (1824–1878), ornithologist
 Oliver Heaviside (1850–1925), mathematician and physicist
 James Hector (1834–1907), geologist and naturalist
 John Stevens Henslow (1796–1861), mineralogist and botanist
 Vernon Heywood (born 1927), botanist
 Julia Higgins (born 1942), polymer scientist
 Peter Higgs (born 1929), particle physicist
 Archibald Vivian Hill (1886–1977), physiologist,
 Cyril Norman Hinshelwood (1897–1967), physical chemist
 Peter Hirsch (born 1925), minerals scientist
 George Hockham (1938–2013), electromagnetic engineer
 Dorothy Hodgkin (1910–1994), chemist
 Brian Houghton Hodgson (1800–1894), naturalist
 Anthony Hollander (born 1964), integrative biologist
 Robert Hooke (1635–1703), natural philosopher
 Joseph Dalton Hooker (1817–1911), botanist
 William Jackson Hooker (1785–1865), botanist
 Frederick Gowland Hopkins (1861–1947), biochemist
 Victor Horsley (1857–1916), medical scientist
 Albert Howard (1873–1947), botanist
 Henry Eliot Howard (1873–1940), ornithologist
 Allan Octavian Hume (1829–1912), ornithologist
 Rob Hume (born 20th century), ornithologist
 Rosalinde Hurley (1929–2004), microbiologist
 Harold Edwin Hurst (1880–1978), hydrologist
 Janet Husband (born 20th century), radiologist
 Frederick Hutton (1835–1905), biologist and geologist
 Hugh Huxley (1924–2013), muscle biochemist
 Julian Sorell Huxley (1887–1975), zoologist and evolutionary theorist
 Thomas Henry Huxley (1825–1895), zoologist

I
 Ray Iles (born 20th century), oncologist
 Jane Ingham (1897–1982), botanist
 Jan Ingenhousz (1730–1799), botanist
 Christopher Kelk Ingold (1893–1970), mechanistic organic chemist
 Keith Ingold (born 1929), chemist
 Tom Iredale (1880–1972), conchologist and ornithologist

J
 William Jardine (1800–1874), naturalist
 James Prescott Joule (1818-1889), physicist and chemist
 Alec Jeffreys (born 1950), geneticist
 Edward Jenner (1749–1823), pioneer immunologist
 John Gwyn Jeffreys (1809–1885), conchologist and malacologist
 Thomas C. Jerdon (1811–1872), zoologist and botanist
 Harren Jhoti (born 1962), structural biologist
 Joanne Johnson (born 1977): geologist, Antarctic scientist
 Mark H. Johnson (born 1960), cognitive neuroscientist
 Pauline Johnson (born 20th century), immunologist and microbiologist

K
 Ebenezer Kinnersley (1711-1778), physicist
 Henrik Kacser (1918–1995), geneticist and biochemist
 Charles K. Kao (1933–2018), electrical engineer and physicist
 Alan R. Katritzky (1928–2014), chemist
 Janet Kear (1933–2004), ornithologist
 Frank Kearton (1911–1992), chemist
 Douglas Kell (born 1953), biochemist
 David Kelly (1944–2003), weapons expert
 John Kendrew (1917–1997) biochemist and crystallographer
 Gerald A. Kerkut (1927–2004), zoologist and physiologist
 Aaron Klug (1926–2018), biophysicist and chemist
 Alexander King (1909–2007), chemist
 Norman Boyd Kinnear (1882–1957), zoologist
 William Kirby (1759–1850), entomologist
 Gilbert Knowles (1667–1734), botanist
 Jeremy Knowles (1935–2008), enzyme chemist
 Rudolf Kompfner (1909–1977), engineer and physicist
 Harry Kroto (1939–2016), chemist.
 John Howard Kyan (1774–1850), inventor

L
 John Lathem (1740-1837), physician
 David Lack (1910–1973), ornithologist
 Patrick Laidlaw (1881–1940), virologist
 Aylmer Bourke Lambert (1761–1842), botanist
 Hugh Lamprey (1928–1996), ecologist
 John Latham(1740–1837), ornithologist
 Colin Leakey (1933–2018), tropical botanist
 Louis Leakey (1903–1972), archaeologist and naturalist
 Louise Leakey (born 1972), paleontologist
 Mary Leakey (1913–1996), paleoanthropologist
 Meave Leakey (born 1942), paleontologist
 Richard Leakey (1944–2022), paleontologist and archaeologist
 John Henry Lefroy (1817–1890), physicist and magnetism surveyor
 John Lennard-Jones (1894–1954), theoretical physicist
 John Lightfoot (1735–1788), conchologist and botanist
 John Lindley (1799–1865), botanist
 Joseph Lister (1827–1912), pioneer of antiseptic surgery
 Christopher Longuet-Higgins (1923–2004), theoretical chemist and cognitive scientist
 John Claudius Loudon (1783–1843), botanist
 Ada Lovelace (1815–1852), mathematician and computing pioneer
 James Lovelock (1919–2022), father of the Gaia hypothesis
 Percy Lowe (1870–1948), ornithologist
 Martin Lowry (1874–1936), physical chemist
 Richard Lydekker (1849–1915), naturalist

M
 John Macadam (1827–1865), botanist
 George G. Macfarlane (1916–2007), researcher on radar
 William MacGillivray (1796–1852), naturalist
 Emery Molyneux (death 1598), sphere maker geometric and mathematician
 Walcher of Malvern (death 1135), mathematician
 Harry Marsh (born 1926), carbon chemist
 Charles James Martin (1866–1955), epidemiologist
 John Martyn (1699–1768), botanist
 Thomas Martyn (1735–1825), botanist, entomologist and conchologist
 Francis Masson (1741–1805), botanist
 Neil D. Mathur (born 20th century), materials physicist
 James Clerk Maxwell (1831–1879), physicist
 Harold Maxwell-Lefroy (1877–1925), entomologist
 John McCafferty (born 20th century), immunologist
 Robert May (1936–2020), ecologist and mathematician
 Edmund Meade-Waldo (1855–1934), ornithologist
 Archibald Menzies (1754–1852), naturalist
 Peter H Millard (1937–2018), geriatrician
 Philip Miller (1691–1771), botanist
 John F. B. Mitchell (born 1948), climatologist
 Peter Mitchell (1920–1992), biochemist
 George Jackson Mivart (1827–1900), biologist
 Henry Moseley (1887–1915), physicist, originator of the concept atomic number
 William Musgrave (1655–1721), physician and antiquary

N
 John Napier (1550–1617), mathematician, physicist and astronomer
 John Needham (1713–1781), naturalist
 Thomas Newcomen (1664-1729), inventor
 Joseph Needham (1900–1995), biochemist and historian
 Charles F. Newcombe (1851–1924), botanist
 John Newlands (1837–1898), chemist who studied the periodicity of elements
 Alfred Newton (1829–1907), zoologist
 Isaac Newton (1642–1726/27), mathematician, physicist and astronomer
 Thomas Norton (1416-1513), alchemist
 Henry Alleyne Nicholson (1844–1899), zoologist
 William Nicholson (1753–1815), chemist
 Denis Noble (born 1936), physiologist
 Ronald George Wreyford Norrish (1897–1978), chemist
 Paul Nurse (born 1949), geneticist

O
 William Ogilby (1808–1873), naturalist
 Bridget Ogilvie (born 1938), parasitologist
 William Robert Ogilvie-Grant (1863–1924), ornithologist
 Tony Orchard (1941–2005) inorganic chemist.
 Eleanor Anne Ormerod (1828–1901), entomologist
 Edward Latham Ormerod (1819–1873), physician and entomologist
 William Charles Osman Hill (1901–1975), anatomist and primatologist
 Ian Osterloh (born 20th century), clinical researcher
 Richard Owen (1804–1892), biologist, palaeontologist and taxonomist

P
 James Price (1752—1783), chemist
 Edward Palmer (1829–1911), botanist
 Woodbine Parish (1796–1882), geology and palaeontologist
 William Paterson (1755–1810), botanist and explorer
 Arthur Lindo Patterson (1902–1966), X-ray crystallographer
 Robert Patterson (1802–1872), naturalist
 David Peakall (1931–2001), toxicologist
 Thomas Pennant (1726–1798), naturalist and antiquary
 Joseph Barclay Pentland (1797–1873), geographer
 William Henry Perkin (1838–1907), organic chemist
 William Henry Perkin, Jr. (1860–1929), organic chemist
 Max Perutz (1914–2002), x-ray crystallographer and molecular biologist
 George Perry, 19th century naturalist
 Eva Philbin (1914–2005), chemist
 Chris Phillips (born ca. 1958), physicist
 Constantine John Phipps (1744–1792), explorer
 David Andrew Phoenix (born 1966), biochemist
 Frederick Octavius Pickard-Cambridge (1860–1905), entomologist
 Octavius Pickard-Cambridge (1828–1917), entomologist
 Henry Piddington (1797–1858), meteorologist
 Andrew Pitman (born 1964), atmospheric scientist
 Reginald Innes Pocock (1863–1947), taxonomist
 Vicky Pope (born 20th century), climatologist
 John Pople (1925–2004), theoretical chemist
 Cicely Popplewell (1920–1995), computer scientist
 George Porter (1920–2002), chemist
 Thomas Littleton Powys (1833–1896), ornithologist
 Joseph Hubert Priestley (1883–1944), botanist
 Joseph Priestley (1733–1804), chemist and philosopher

R
 George Ripley (1415-1490), alchemist
 Stamford Raffles (1781–1826), statesman and botanist
 Lawrence Rooke (1622-1662), mathematician and astronomer
 Venki Ramakrishnan (born 1952), structural biologist
 William Ramsay (1852–1916), chemist who discovered the noble gases
 Matthew Raper (1705–1778), astronomer and mathematician
 Chris Rapley (born 1947), climatologist
 John Ray (also written John Wray, 1627–1705), naturalist
 Lovell Augustus Reeve (1814–1865), conchologist
 Michael Reiss (born 1960), bioethicist
 Osborne Reynolds (1842–1912), physicist
 Tracey Reynolds, sociologist
 John Richardson (1787–1865) naval surgeon, naturalist and arctic explorer
 Henry Nicholas Ridley (1855–1956) botanist, geologist and naturalist
 Robert Robinson (1886–1975) organic chemist
 Sheila Rodwell (Sheila Bingham, 1947–2009), nutritional epidemiologist
 Miriam Louisa Rothschild (1908–2005), entomologist
 Walter Rothschild (1868–1937), zoologist
 William Roxburgh (1759–1815), botanist
 Gordon Rugg (born 1955), computer scientist
 Daniel Rutherford (1749–1819), physician, chemist and botanist
 Ernest Rutherford (1871–1937), physicist, known as the father of nuclear physics
 Bertrand Russell (1872–1970), philosopher and mathematician

S
 Johannes de Sacrobosco (1195-1256), mathematician and astronomer
 Joseph Sabine (1770–1837), botanist and horticulturist
 Edward James Salisbury (1886–1978), botanist
 Richard Anthony Salisbury (1761–1829), botanist
 Frederick Sanger (1918–2013), biochemist
 Philip Sclater (1829–1913), zoologist
 Henry Seebohm (1832–1895), ornithologist
 Prideaux John Selby (1788–1867), botanist and ornithologist
 Richard Bowdler Sharpe (1847–1909), zoologist
 Nigel Shadbolt (born 1956), computer scientist
 George Shaw (1751–1813), botanist and zoologist
 George Ernest Shelley (1840–1910), ornithologist
 John Sherwood (ca. 1933 to 2020), physical organic chemist
 Charles Scott Sherrington (1857–1922), physiologist and neuroscientist
 Sydney Selwyn (1934–1996), medical microbiologist
 Andrew Smith (1797–1872), zoologist
 Edgar Albert Smith (1847–1916), zoologist and conchologist
 Frederick Smith (1805–1879), entomologist
 George D. W. Smith (born 1943), materials scientist
 James Edward Smith (1759–1828), botanist
 John Maynard Smith (1920–2004), biologist
 Douglas Spalding (1841–1877), behaviourist
 Walter Baldwin Spencer (1860–1929), anthropologist
 Charles Stanhope (1753–1816), mathematician and physicist
 Edward Stanley (1775–1851), naturalist
 James Francis Stephens (1792–1853), zoologist
 Frederick Campion Steward (1904–1993), botanist
 James Stirling (1953–2018), physicist
 Peter A. Stott (born 20th century), climatologist
 John Struthers (1823–1899), anatomist
 Audrey Stuckes (1923–2006), material scientist
 Samuel Stutchbury (1798–1859), naturalist and geologist
 William John Swainson (1789–1855), ornithologist, malacologist, conchologist and entomologist
 Robert Swinhoe (1836–1877), naturalist
 Peter Sykes (1923–2003), chemist
 William Henry Sykes (1790–1872), ornithologist
 Frederick Soddy (1877-1956), chemist
 Thomas Savery (17-18th century), Engineer who invented the first commercial steam pump

T
 Oldfield Thomas (1858–1929) zoologist
 Benjamin Thompson (Count Rumford, 1753–1814), physicist and inventor
 Charles Wyville Thomson (1832–1882), marine biologist
 D'Arcy Wentworth Thompson (1860–1942), mathematician and biologist
 William Thompson (1805–1852), ornithologist and naturalist
 J. J. Thomson (1856–1940), physicist
 William Thomson (Lord Kelvin), 1824–1907), physicist
 Samuel Tickell (1811–1875), ornithologist
 Stephen Toulmin (1922–2009), philosopher and historian of science
 John Sealy Townsend (1868–1957), mathematical physicist
 Thomas Stewart Traill (1781–1862), doctor and naturalist
 Eric Trist (1909–1993), psychologist
 Henry Baker Tristram (1822–1906), ornithologist
 Bernard Tucker (1901–1950), ornithologist
 Marmaduke Tunstall (1743–1790), ornithologist
 Alan Turing (1912–1954), computer scientist
 Arthur James Turner (1889–1971), textile technologist
 William Turton (1762–1835), naturalist

U
 James Underwood (born 1942), pathologist
 Olga Uvarov (1910–2001), veterinary surgeon

V
 Nicholas Aylward Vigors (1785–1840), zoologist

W
 Richard Of Wallingford (1292-1336), mathematician, astronomer, astrologer
 William of Ockham (1287-1347), physicist and philosopher
 John Westwyk (born 14th century), astronomer
 Nicholas Wald (born 20th century), Professor of Preventive Medicine
 Francis Willoughby (1635-1672), versatile scientist
 Alfred Russel Wallace (1823–1913), naturalist and biologist
 Kevin Warwick (born 1954), computer scientist and neurobiologist
 Charles Waterton (1782–1865), naturalist
 Andrew Watson (born 1952), marine biologist
 Alexander Watt (1892–1985), botanist
 Edwin C. Webb (1921–2006), biochemist
 Philip Barker Webb (1793–1854), botanist
 Hugh Algernon Weddell (1819–1877), botanist
 Richard Burkewood Welbourn (1919–2005), endocrinologist
 Michael Wells (born 20th century), pathologist
 Thomas Summers West (1927–2010), chemist
 Michael Whelan (born 1931), materials scientist
 William Joseph Whelan (1924–2021) biochemist
 Gilbert White (1720–1795), naturalist
 John White (c. 1756–1832), botanist
 Elsie Widdowson (1906–2000), nutritionist
 Maurice Wilkins (1916–2004), biophysicist
 James H. Wilkinson (1919–1986), numerical analyst
 Mark Williamson (born 20th century), biologist
 Francis Willughby (1635–1672), ornithologist and ichthyologist
 Alexander Wilson (1766–1813), ornithologist
 Alan Wilson (born 1939), mathematician
 E. A. Wilson (1872–1912), naturalist
 Greg Winter (born 1951), molecular biologist
 Heinz Wolff (1928–2017), bioengineer
 John Wray (1627–1705), naturalist

Y
 William Yarrell (1784–1856), naturalist
 John Zachary Young (1907–1997), neurophysiologist
 Thomas Young (1773–1829), polymath

British
Science and technology in the United Kingdom
Scientists
Scientists
List